Brown-Cowles House and Cowles Law Office, also known as the Paul Osborne House and Law and Bride Cottage, is a historic home and law office located at Wilkesboro in Wilkes County, North Carolina, United States. The Cowles Law Office was built about 1871, and is a small one-story frame building with gable roof and single-shoulder end chimney.  The original section of the Brown-Cowles House was built about 1834, and enlarged with a two-story wing by 1885 and enlarged again between 1920 and 1926.  It is a two-story frame dwelling with Federal style detailing.  Also on the property are the contributing curing house and kitchen.  It was the home of William H. H. Cowles (1840-1901), a lawyer and four-term Congressman during the 1880s and 1890s.

It was listed on the National Register of Historic Places in 1982.

See also 
 Alfred Moore Scales Law Office: NRHP listing in Madison, North Carolina
 Thomas B. Finley Law Office: NRHP listing also in Wilkesboro, North Carolina
 Archibald Henderson Law Office: NRHP listing in Salisbury, North Carolina
 Nash Law Office: NRHP listing in Hillsborough, North Carolina
 Zollicoffer's Law Office: NRHP listing in Henderson, North Carolina
 National Register of Historic Places listings in Wilkes County, North Carolina

References

Houses on the National Register of Historic Places in North Carolina
Federal architecture in North Carolina
Victorian architecture in North Carolina
Houses completed in 1834
Houses in Wilkes County, North Carolina
National Register of Historic Places in Wilkes County, North Carolina
Law offices
Legal history of North Carolina
1834 establishments in Kentucky